Ivesdale is a village in Champaign County, Illinois, United States; a very small portion of the village extends into Piatt County, Illinois. The population was 265 at the 2020 census.

History 

Ivesdale is served by Saint Joseph Catholic Parish and is home to Saint Joseph Roman Catholic Church (built in 1894) which is known locally as "The Cathedral of the Cornfield". 

Bernard Alblinger, who served as mayor from 1963 until his death in 2011, the second longest-serving mayor in the history of Illinois, serving a total of 48 consecutive years.

Geography

Demographics
As of the 2020 census there were 265 people, 113 households, and 74 families residing in the village. The racial makeup of the village was 95.85% White, 0.38% African American, and 3.77% from two or more races. Hispanic or Latino of any race were 0.75% of the population.

There were 113 households, out of which 44.25% had children under the age of 18 living with them, 52.21% were married couples living together, 8.85% had a female householder with no husband present, and 34.51% were non-families. 28.32% of all households were made up of individuals, and 19.47% had someone living alone who was 65 years of age or older. The average household size was 2.68 and the average family size was 2.21.

The village's age distribution consisted of 21.6% under the age of 18, 6.8% from 18 to 24, 27.2% from 25 to 44, 26.8% from 45 to 64, and 17.6% who were 65 years of age or older. The median age was 39.9 years. For every 100 females, there were 88.0 males. For every 100 females age 18 and over, there were 79.8 males.

The median income for a household in the village was $51,477, and the median income for a family was $56,250. Males had a median income of $47,917 versus $26,500 for females. The per capita income for the village was $25,204. About 14.9% of families and 17.6% of the population were below the poverty line, including 27.8% of those under age 18 and 22.7% of those age 65 or over.

References

Villages in Champaign County, Illinois